Elections to Rochdale Council were held on 10 June 2004.  The whole council was up for election with boundary changes since the last election in 2003.  The council stayed under no overall control.

Results summary

Ward results

External links
BBC report of 2004 Rochdale election result

2004 English local elections
2004
2000s in Greater Manchester